Jason Kawau (born 5 February 1981 in Lumsden, New Zealand) is  a rugby union player currently playing for the Kobelco Steelers in the Top League in Japan.

Playing career

Kawau made his provincial debut for Otago in 2003 but unfortunately due to a major knee injury in the lead up to the first game of the season he only made it back for the final 2 games of the 2003 season. In 2004 he made 6 appearances for Otago. Due to a lack of consistent game time Kawau transferred to Southland in 2005, where his career would blossom.

Kawau spent 5 seasons as a starter in the Stags' backfield, making his 50th appearance during the 2009 Air New Zealand Cup. His tenure with Southland would end on a high with the team's Ranfurly Shield triumph over Canterbury near the end of the 2009 season.

After impressing for Southland, Kawau was called into the Highlanders squad part-way through the 2006 Super 14 season as an injury replacement, and made two appearances. He was a full squad member the following season, and scored 3 tries in just 6 appearances. However, he was not included in the Highlanders squad for 2008.

Kawau returned to Super Rugby in 2009 when he was drafted to the Hurricanes and made 9 appearances, mainly as a substitute. He was back with the Hurricanes in 2010, but missed most of the season due to injury, only returning for 6 matches at the end of the year.

Kawau signed in Japan with the Kobelco Steelers for the 2010–11 season.

References
Hurricanes profile
Maori Profile
http://www.kobelcosteelers.com/pc_member/

New Zealand rugby union players
Highlanders (rugby union) players
Hurricanes (rugby union) players
Otago rugby union players
Southland rugby union players
Kobelco Kobe Steelers players
Kurita Water Gush Akishima players
New Zealand expatriate rugby union players
New Zealand expatriate sportspeople in Japan
Expatriate rugby union players in Japan
Living people
1981 births
Māori All Blacks players
Rugby union centres
University of Otago alumni
People educated at Otago Boys' High School
People from Lumsden, New Zealand
Rugby union players from Southland, New Zealand